Knowledge City may refer to:
 Markaz Knowledge City, a city in Kerala, India
 Knowledge Economic City, Medina, a city in Saudi Arabia